Salmon Creek Falls is a 120-foot (36 meter) waterfall in the southern Big Sur region of Monterey County, California.

Location

Hydrology
As Salmon Creek descends a canyon along the southwestern slope of the Santa Lucia Range, it produces a series of small cataracts over a distance of  before reaching the head of the main falls. Here the water pools behind several large boulders. The creek then curves around the boulders before cascading  down a steep cliff. A shallow pool is present at the base of the falls. From here, the creek continues southwest toward the Pacific Ocean.

Access
An unpaved  trail from California State Route 1 provides access to a view of the main falls beside several large boulders. The trail does not provide direct access to the base of the falls, which requires one to scramble over a pair of boulders to reach.

The head of the falls are accessible via Salmon Creek Trail, which branches off toward the east and approaches the falls at a higher elevation. The trail is a popular access route for backpackers visiting Silver Peak Wilderness.

See also
Limekiln State Park

References

External links
Waterfalls West.com: Salmon Creek Falls

Waterfalls of California
Landforms of Monterey County, California
Monterey Ranger District, Los Padres National Forest
Santa Lucia Range